Naked yoga (Sanskrit nagna yoga or vivastra yoga) is the practice of yoga without clothes. It has existed since ancient times as a spiritual practice, and is mentioned in the 7th-10th century Bhagavata Purana and by the Ancient Greek geographer Strabo.

Early advocates of naked yoga in modern times include the gymnosophists such as Blanche de Vries, and the actress and dancer Marguerite Agniel.

In the 21st century, the practice is gaining popularity, notably in western societies that have more familiarity with social nudity.

Ancient times

Yoga has been practiced naked since ancient times. In the Bhagavata Purana (written c. 800–1000 AD) it is mentioned: 
”A person in the renounced order of life may try to avoid even a dress to cover himself. If he wears anything at all, it should be only a loincloth, and when there is no necessity, a sannyāsī should not even accept a daṇḍa. A sannyāsī should avoid carrying anything but a daṇḍa and kamaṇḍalu.” 

Alexander the Great reached India in the 4th century BC. Along with his army, he took Greek academics with him who later wrote memoirs about geography, people and customs they saw. One of Alexander's companion was Onesicritus, quoted in Book 15, Sections 63-65 by Strabo, who describes yogins of India. Onesicritus claims those Indian yogins (like Mandanis) practiced aloofness and "different postures – standing or sitting or lying naked – and motionless".

Spiritual nudity

The practice of spiritual nudity is common among Digambara Jains, Aghori sadhus, and other ascetic groups in the dharmic religions. The order of Naga Sadhus, conspicuous in the processions and bathing ritual at the Kumbh Mela, use nudity as a part of their spiritual practice of renunciation.

Early 20th century

Modern naked yoga has been practiced in Germany and Switzerland through a movement called Lebensreform. The movement had since the end of the 19th century highlighted yoga and nudity.

In the early 20th century, the term gymnosophy was appropriated by several groups who practiced nudity, asceticism and meditation. Blanche de Vries combined a popularity of Oriental dancing with yoga. In 1914 she was put in charge of a yoga school for women in New York City. Five years later, she opened an institute for women, teaching Yoga Gymnosophy — a name that conveys the blending of yoga and nudism. She taught until 1982.

Marguerite Agniel, author of the 1931 book The Art of the Body : Rhythmic Exercise for Health and Beauty, wrote a piece called "The Mental Element in Our Physical Well-Being" for The Nudist, an American magazine, in 1938; it showed nude women practising yoga, accompanied by a text on attention to the breath. The social historian Sarah Schrank comments that it made perfect sense at this stage of the development of yoga in America to combine nudism and yoga, as "both were exercises in healthful living; both were countercultural and bohemian; both highlighted the body; and both were sensual without being explicitly erotic."

From the 1960s

In the West since the 1960s, naked yoga practice has been incorporated in the hippie movement and in progressive settings for well-being, such as at the Esalen Institute in California, and at the Elysium nudist colony in the Topanga Canyon, Los Angeles.

Male-only groups

Aaron Star, owner of Hot Nude Yoga, began his version of naked yoga in April 2001. The style combined elements of Ashtanga, Kundalini, and Contact Yoga with elements of Tantra.
Because of the success of Hot Nude Yoga, male-only naked yoga groups began to blossom all over the world, from London, Moscow, Madrid to Sydney, often becoming associated with the gay community. Nowadays, there are also specific naked yoga clubs for homosexuals that are not simple yoga classes, but rather communities for keeping fit and sharing sexuality. Star says that his practice affords men in cities a way to express closeness and intimacy without having sex.

Schrank writes that "the most press" has however gone to Joschi Schwartz and Monika Werner's Bold and Naked studio in New York. It provides classes in tantric massage as well as both male-only and co-ed naked yoga. She praises its "positive coverage" as helping yogis of all kinds to feel good, but is concerned about the contradictory message that yoga is simultaneously "liberating and sexy".

All genders
While naked yoga had mainly been the domain of male only groups, from 2011 courses in Britain and the United States were offered to all genders.

Schrank noted the popularity of naked yoga in 2016, with its simultaneous desire to experience one's own body in freedom, and a "troubling" sexualization of the body in yoga culture. She observed that in the United States, there is a connection between female nudity and slavery, something that has left a racist legacy. Schrank noted also the "uncomfortable" relationship of yoga and sex, not least in scandals of sexual abuse by yoga gurus, and that feminists have written critiques of the "objectification of young, white women and exclusion of women of color." On the other hand, she praises the naked yoga teacher Katrina "Rainsong" Messenger's book R.A.W. Nude Yoga: Celebrating the Human Body Temple, featuring monochrome photographs of both men and women, as impressive, tasteful, and sensual but not erotic. Schrank personally tried a naked yoga class in Los Angeles, at first finding it safe and pleasurable because not sexualized, until after two months the experience was spoiled by a class which was sexist and "overtly sexually competitive".

In film

Esalen's naked yoga was depicted in the 1968 comedy film Bob & Carol & Ted & Alice. 
Other film depictions include the 1967 I Am Curious (Yellow) with Lena Nyman, the 1973 The Harrad Experiment and that same year the short documentary Naked Yoga.

See also

 Asana
 List of yoga hybrids
 Naturism
 Nudity
 Nudity in religion

References

Further reading
 Naked Yoga, by Yen Chu and George Monty Davis (1st printing had no ISBN).
 A Book of Yoga: The Body Temple, by Jo Ann Weinrib and David Weinrib, 1974, .
 Nude & Natural magazine, "Naked Yoga: A Sanctuary and Source of Strength", by Kevin Brett. Issue 25.3, Spring 2006.
 Shakti: The Feminine Power of Yoga (Hardcover) by Shiva Rea (Foreword), Victoria Davis, . Photographs of yoginis in the nude.

External links

 Naked Yoga Alliance Interviews naked yoga teacher Anya from New Jersey
 The Boston Phoenix AU NATUREL Yoga buffs By Nina Willdorf, Issue Date: April 26 - May 3, 2001
 China Daily 23 September 2004 Naked yoga OK in San Francisco
 Naturist UK Fact File page on yoga and naturism
 Striking a pose, stark naked by Charlotte Maitre

Yoga styles
Naturism